Ardenais is a commune in the Cher department in the Centre-Val de Loire region of France.

Geography

Population

Places of interest
 The church of St.Sulpice, dating from the nineteenth century.
 A building, with a tower, dating from the fifteenth century.

See also
Communes of the Cher department

References

Communes of Cher (department)